The Kagoshima Aquarium (ja:いおワールドかごしま水族館, Io World Kagoshima suizokukan) is a Public Aquarium of Kagoshima City located in Kagoshima Prefecture Kagoshima City Honkoshinmachi.

History 
Opened on May 30, 1997. The Kagoshima coast, which is washed by Kuroshio, and Kagoshima Bay marine life are mainly exhibited, but brackish water and river life are also handled.  The specialties are whale shark (Yuyu) and Satsumahaorimushi.  The Japanese name "Io" is Kagoshima dialect and means fish. Total project cost is about 12.7 billion yen. The appearance is an image of Stingray. Kagoshima Aquarium is the first aquarium in Japan to successfully feed Chinese sturgeon and display under salt water. In October 2011, the number of visitors reached 10 million. At the end of the route, the "Sea of Silence", which was conceived by the first director, Hiromasa Yoshida, is displayed along with the text.  The creatures are not exhibited inside and are filled only with water, but it is said that this is to make people think about the marine environment.

Exhibits

The hall is from the 5th floor to the 2nd basement floor, and you can walk along the route to see it.
 Kuroshio Sea "Kuroshio Large Aquarium" - Whale Shark, Rhina ancylostoma, Spotted Eagle Ray, Chinese Sturgeon, Bluefin Tuna, Katsuo, Milkfish, etc.
 Nansei Islands Sea-Giant Grouper,  Damselfish, Butterflyfish, Heteroconger hassi, Coral, Comatulida Kind etc.
 Sea of Kagoshima-Spider crab, Moray eel, Spiny lobster, Flounder, Banded coral shrimp, Sardine, Bullhead shark, etc.
 Observation Hall-Tropical Bottlenose Whale Whole body skeleton specimen.  You can see Sakurajima on the opposite bank in front of you.
 Satsumahaorimushi corner
 Seaweed and fish-Aquarium that reproduces the coastal Kelp forest. Pandaka etc.
 Freshwater aquarium-Vallisneria asiatica, Oryzias, Caridina multidentata, Freshwater shrimp, etc.
 Life of jellyfish-Moon jellyfish, Spotted jellyfish, etc.
 Theater room
 Giant mottled eel Aquarium-Giant mottled eel, Flagtail
cafeteria
 Giant mottled eel Aquarium / Arapaima Aquarium
 Mangrove Aquarium-Terapon jarbua, Mudskipper, etc.
 Seal Aquarium-Spotted Seal
 Dolphin pool-Bottlenose dolphin
 Amusement shop
 Touch pool-starfish, sea cucumber
 Outdoor waterway -Ocean Sunfish, Mahi-mahietc.

Whale shark "Yuyu" 
Therefore, the Kagoshima Aquarium is exhibited and captivity by the "Kagoshima method", in which training is conducted to return to the wild before the body length reaches , and then returned to the wild. A transmitter is attached to the whale shark that returns to the sea, and it has been successful in grasping the migration route of the whale shark.。

The whale sharks raised in the Kuroshio Tank have been called "Yuyu" for generations and are gaining popularity among visitors.
 First generation (male)
 October 20, 2000 Kagoshima Prefecture Takayama Town (currently Kimotsuki Town) Set Net.  Body length .
 November 22, 2000: Exhibition captivity started in the Kuroshio tank.
 July 24, 2002 Moved from the Kuroshio Tank to a marine cage in Kagoshima Prefecture Kasasa Town (currently Minamisatsuma City).
 Released on August 1, 2002.
 Second generation (male)
 June 17, 2002 Captured with a fixed net in Kagoshima Prefecture Kasasa Towm (currently Minamisatsuma City).  Body length .
 July 24, 2002 Started captivity on display at the Kuroshio Tank.
 July 28, 2005 Moved from the Kuroshio Tank to the marine cage in Kasasa Town, Kagoshima Prefecture.
 Released off the coast of Cape Noma, Kasasa-cho on August 8, 2005.
 Third generation (female)
 June 25, 2005 Kagoshima Prefecture Bonotsucho Akime Captured with a set net off the coast.  Body length .
 July 28, 2005 Started exhibiting and captivity in the Kuroshio Tank.
 July 21, 2007 Moved from the Large Kuroshio Tank to a marine cage in Minamisatsuma City, Kagoshima Prefecture.
 Released off the coast of Kasasa, Minamisatsuma City on July 31, 2007.
 4th generation (male)
 July 20, 2005 Captured with a set net in Kasasa Town, Kagoshima Prefecture.  Body length , weight 15.2kg.
 July 21, 2005 Delivered to Kagoshima Aquarium.
 October 27, 2005 Exhibited and captivity under the nickname "Yuta" in the underwater tunnel part of the Kuroshio Tank, separated from other exhibited creatures.
 July 21, 2007 Started exhibiting as the 4th generation Yuyu.  Body length .
 August 4, 2009 Moved from the Kuroshio Tank to the marine cage in Minamisatsuma City, Kagoshima Prefecture.  Body length .
 August 5, 2009 Found dead in a marine cage in Minamisatsuma City, Kagoshima Prefecture.
 Fifth generation (male)
 June 25, 2009 Captured with a fixed net in Kasasa-cho, Minamisatsuma City, Kagoshima Prefecture.  Body length .
 August 4, 2009: Exhibition breeding started in the Kuroshio tank.
 August 23, 2011 Moved from the Kuroshio Tank to the marine cage in Minamisatsuma City, Kagoshima Prefecture.  Body length .
 Released off the coast of Noma Cape, Minamisatsuma City on September 7, 2011.  (Equipped with satellite transmitter)
 6th generation (male)
 July 15, 2011 Captured with a set net of the Kaiei Fisheries Cooperative in Ibusuki City.  Body length .
 August 23, 2011: Exhibition captivity started in the Kuroshio tank.
 November 4, 2014 Moved from the Kuroshio Tank to a marine cage off the coast of Kataura Port, Kasasa-cho, Minamisatsuma City, Kagoshima Prefecture.
 November 9, 2014: Physical condition suddenly changed and death was confirmed.
 7th generation (male)
 August 3, 2015 Captured with a set net of the Takayama Fisheries Cooperative in Kimotsuki Town.  Body length .
 August 23, 2015: Exhibition captivity started in the Kuroshio tank.

It was planned to be exhibited as a highlight from the beginning of the museum in 1997, but it died in March and May of the same year, and it has a history of opening without a whale shark.

Tropical Bottlenose Whale 
A whole-body skeleton specimen of the tropical bottlenose whale Indopacetus pacificus is displayed in the observation hall on the 5th floor.  Tropical bottlenose whales are extremely rare whales, and it is rare to observe whole-body skeleton specimens.

This skeleton specimen is a specimen of an individualNational Museum of Nature and Science, Kagoshima Aquarium, and University of Auckland that was washed ashore in Kagoshima Prefecture Satsumasendai City on July 26, 2002.

Sanderia malayensis 
The jellyfish corridor opened in March 2017, and is exhibiting the world's first deep-sea inhabited Sanderia malayensis.

Rhynchobatus mononoke 
In 2020, research by research groups such as Kuroshio Biological Research Institute revealed that the ray that had been bred for 23 years as Rhynchobatus djiddensis since its opening was a new species called Rhynchobatus mononoke. The discovery of a new species of ray in the waters near Japan is said to be the first in about 10 years.

Gallery 
Exterior

Aquarium

Dolphin pool

References

External links
Official Site 
Official Site 

Aquaria in Japan
Buildings and structures in Kagoshima
Museums in Kagoshima Prefecture
Zoos established in 1997
1997 establishments in Japan